Alo Dupikov (born 5 November 1985 in Kehtna) is a former Estonian professional footballer, who played as a striker. During his career he earned five caps for Estonia national team in friendlies.

Club career
On 1 July 2010 in Europa League qualification match against Dinamo Tbilisi Dupikov scored his first European competition goal.

Dupikov joined JK Nõmme Kalju's pre-season training in December 2012 and officially became part of the club on 21 January 2013, when he signed a two-year contract with the Estonian champions.

International career
Dupikov made his international debut on 29 May 2009 in a friendly match against Wales.

References

External links
 
 
 

1985 births
Living people
People from Kehtna Parish
Estonian footballers
Association football forwards
FC Valga players
FC Flora players
Viljandi JK Tulevik players
JK Sillamäe Kalev players
Estonia international footballers
Estonian people of Russian descent
Estonian expatriate footballers
Estonian expatriate sportspeople in Norway
Expatriate footballers in Norway
JK Tervis Pärnu players
Estonia under-21 international footballers
Estonia youth international footballers